The Currie Cup / Central Series was a rugby union competition held between the Currie Cup and Currie Cup Central A teams, the top two tiers of the premier domestic competition in South Africa. This formed part of the 1986-1994 Currie Cup seasons.

The Currie Cup team with the best record would win the Percy Frames Trophy, the Central A team with the best record would win the W.V. Simkins Trophy.

The competition spanned from 1986-1994.

The winners of the Percy Frames Trophy 1986-1994

See also
 Rugby union in South Africa
 Vodacom Cup
 Lion Cup

References

 
1986 establishments in South Africa